Sébastien Zamet may refer to:

 Sébastien Zamet (born 1549), French banker
 Sébastien Zamet (born 1588), French bishop